Hafizabad railway station is located in Hafizabad city, Hafizabad district of Punjab province of the Pakistan.

See also
 List of railway stations in Pakistan
 Pakistan Railways

References

External links

Railway stations in Hafizabad District
Railway stations on Khanewal–Wazirabad Line